Kangan is a town located near Ganderbal, in the Ganderbal district of Jammu and Kashmir, India. It is one of the tehsils in District Ganderbal. It is situated across the Nallah Sindh and spread over a 50-km-long gorge valley, with population of 120,934 and literacy rate of 52.8% and sex ratio 868 per thousand males. Widely regarded for its beauty, it is surrounded by various picnic spots like Sonamarg and Naranag.

Etymology 

The translation, from Hindi, means 'bracelet' and is believed that this is derived from the town's location; being surrounded by mountains on all sides.

Geography 

Demographics 
 India census, Kangan had a population of 94874 males constitute 52% of the population and females 48%. Kangan has an average literacy rate of 32.22% lower than the national average of 59.5%: male literacy is 42.67%, and female literacy is 20.47%.

See also
Wakura

References 

Cities and towns in Ganderbal district